Willard Chase (February 1, 1798 – March 10, 1871) was an American  resident of 19th-century New York and an early associate of Joseph Smith, the founder of the Latter Day Saint movement.

Biography
Chase was born to parents Clark Chase (b. August 22, 1770) and Phebe Mason. Chase had two older siblings, Durfee and Mason, and seven younger siblings: Sarah "Sally", Edmund, Purley, Lucinda, Henry, Abel D., and Asa S.

Chase married Malissa Sanders Sounders. The couple had two children: Luther M. and Clark S.

Chase was a carpenter and lay Methodist minister.

Chase died in Palmyra, New York, on March 10, 1871.

Role in Early Mormonism
Chase engaged in the practice of treasure hunting or "money digging". Neighbors, such as physician John Stafford, recalled that Chase's sister Sally used a seer stone to locate treasure.

Chase lived "over the hill to the East" of the Smiths in Palmyra. In 1833, Chase swore an affidavit that was published in the book Mormonism Unvailed by E. D. Howe.
I became acquainted with the Smith family, known as the authors of the Mormon Bible, in the year 1820. At that time, they were engaged in the money digging business, which they followed until the latter part of the season of 1827.

Seer stone discovery and dispute
Chase relates the story of the 1822 discovery of Joseph Smith's seer stone, which was "chocolate-colored and about the size of an egg":
In the year 1822, I was engaged in digging a well. I employed Alvin and Joseph Smith .... We discovered a singularly appearing stone .... Joseph put it into his hat, and then his face into the top of his hat. After obtaining the stone, he began to publish abroad what wonders he could discover by looking in it .... I ordered the stone to be returned to me again. He had it in his possession about two years. Some time in 1825, Hiram came to me, and wished to borrow the same stone .... I told him  if he would pledge me his word and honor, that I should have it when called for, he might take it;

Chase describes a dispute over the ownership of the stone:
In the fall of 1826, a friend called upon me and wished to see that stone .... On going to Smith's, and asking him for the stone, he said, "you cannot have it;" I told him it belonged to me, repeated to him the promise he made me, at the time of obtaining the stone: upon which he faced me with a malignant look and said, "I don't care who in the Devil it belongs to, you shall not have it."

As late as 1830, Chase was still trying to recover the stone.

Early story of gold plates
Chase records hearing an early version of Smith's golden plates story from Joseph Smith, Sr.:
In the month of June, 1827, Joseph Smith, Sen., related to me the following story: "That some years ago, a spirit had appeared to Joseph his son, in a vision, and informed him that in a certain place there was a record on plates of gold, and that he was the person that must obtain them, and this he must do in the following manner: On the 22d of September, he must repair to the place where was deposited this manuscript, dressed in black clothes, and riding a black horse with a switch tail, and demand the book in a certain name, and after obtaining it, he must go directly away, and neither lay it down nor look behind him. They accordingly fitted out Joseph with a suit of black clothes and borrowed a black horse. He repaired to the place of deposit and demanded the book, which was in a stone box, unsealed, and so near the top of the ground that he could see one end of it, and raising it up, took out the book of gold; but fearing some one might discover where he got it, he laid it down to place back the top stone, as he found it; and turning round, to his surprise there was no book in sight. He again opened the box, and in it saw the book, and attempted to take it out, but was hindered. He saw in the box something like a toad, which soon assumed the appearance of a man, and struck him on the side of his head. — Not being discouraged at trifles, he again stooped down and strove to take the book, when the spirit struck him again, and knocked him three or four rods, and hurt him prodigiously. After recovering from his fright, he enquired why he could not obtain the plates; to which the spirit made reply, because you have not obeyed your orders. He then enquired when he could have them, and was answered thus: come one year from this day, and bring with you your oldest brother, and you shall have them. This spirit, he said was the spirit of the prophet who wrote this book, and who was sent to Joseph Smith, to make known these things to him. Before the expiration of the year, his oldest brother died; which the old man said was an accidental providence!

"Joseph went one year from that day, to demand the book, and the spirit enquired for his brother, and he said that he was dead. The spirit then commanded him to come again, in just one year, and bring a man with him. On asking who might be the man, he was answered that he would know him when he saw him."

Role of Samuel T. Lawrence
According to Chase, Joseph Smith collaborated with seer Samuel T. Lawrence. Chase reported that "Joseph believed that one Samuel T. Lawrence was the man alluded to by the spirit, and went with him to a singular looking hill, in Manchester, and [showed] him where the treasure was."

Lawrence who was able to "see" not only the gold plates but also "saw" the pair of spectacles, which in Mormonism would later be identified with the biblical Urim and Thummim. Chase wrote:
Lawrence asked him if he had ever discovered any thing with the plates of gold; he said no: he then asked him to look in his stone, to see if there was any thing with them. He looked, and said there was nothing; he told him to look again, and see if there was not a large pair of specks with the plates; he looked and soon saw a pair of spectacles, the same with which Joseph says he translated the Book of Mormon.

Lawrence reportedly warned Smith that "it would not be prudent to let these plates be seen for about two years". Lawrence reported that Smith later "altered his mind, and said L. was not the right man, nor had he told him the right place."

Chase described how "in the fall of 1826, [Smith] wanted to go to Pennsylvania to be married". He reportedly attempted to enlist Lawrence in "a very rich mine of silver" on "the bank of the Susquehannah River".

Stowel diggings
Chase describes the diggings on the property of Josiah Stowell:
Now, being still destitute of money, he set his wits at work, how he should get back to Manchester, his place of residence; he hit upon the following plan, which succeeded very well. He went to an honest old Dutchman, by the name of Stowel, and told him that he had discovered on the bank of Black River, in the village of Watertown, Jefferson County, N.Y. a cave, in which he had found a bar of gold, as big as his leg, and about three or four feet long. --That he could not get it out alone, on account of its being fast at one end; and if he would move him to Manchester, N.Y. they would go together, and take a chisel and mallet, and get it, and Stowel should share the prize with him. Stowel moved him.

A short time after their arrival at Manchester, Stowel reminded Joseph of his promise; but he calmly replied, that he would not go, because his wife was now among strangers, and would be very lonesome if he went away. Mr. Stowel was then obliged to return without any gold, and with less money than he came.

Chest requested
Chased described Smith's request for a chest, writing:
In the fore part of September, (I believe) 1827, the Prophet requested me to make him a chest, informing me that he designed to move back to Pennsylvania, and expecting soon to get his gold book, he wanted a chest to lock it up, giving me to understand at the same time, that if I would make the chest he would give me a share in the book. I told him my business was such that I could not make it: but if he would bring the book to me, I would lock it up for him. He said that would not do, as he was commanded to keep it two years, without letting it come to the eye of any one but himself. This commandment, however, he did not keep, for in less than two years, twelve men said they had seen it. I told him to get it and convince me of its existence, and I would make him a chest; but he said, that would not do, as he must have a chest to lock the book in, as soon as he took it out of the ground. I saw him a few days after, when he told me that I must make the chest. I told him plainly that I could not, upon which he told me that I could have no share in the book.

Chase attempts to obtain the plates

Although Chase's affidavit makes no mention of it, Lucy Mack Smith recalled that Chase and others attempted to obtain the Golden Plates themselves. Lucy wrote: "10 or 12 men were clubbed together with one Willard Chase, a Methodist class leader at their head, and what was most ridiculous they had sent for a conjuror to come 60 miles to divine the place where the record was deposited".

Plates discovered
Chase relates the second-hand story about the discovery of the plates:
A few weeks after this conversation, he came to my house, and related the following story: That on the 22d of September, he arose early in the morning, and took a one horse wagon, of some one that had stayed over night at their house, without leave or license; and, together with his wife, repaired to the hill which contained the book. He left his wife in the wagon, by the road, and went alone to the hill, a distance of thirty or forty rods from the road; he said he then took the book out of the ground and hid it in a tree top, and returned home. He then went to the town of Macedon to work. After about ten days, it having been suggested that some one had got his book, his wife went after him; he hired a horse, and went home in the afternoon, staid long enough to drink one cup of tea, and then went for his book, found it safe, took off his frock, wrapt it round it, put it under his arm and run all the way home, a distance of about two miles. He said he should think it would weigh sixty pounds, and was sure it would weigh forty. On his return home, he said he was attacked by two men in the woods, and knocked them both down and made his escape, arrived safe and secured his treasure. -- He then observed that if it had not been for that stone, (which he acknowledged belonged to me) he would not have obtained the book. A few days afterwards, he told one of my neighbors that he had not got any such book, nor never had such an one; but that he had told the story to deceive the d---d fool, (meaning me) to get him to make a chest.

Martin Harris
Chase recalls that Smith "met one day in the streets of Palmyra, a rich man, whose name was Martin Harris, and addressed him thus; 'I have a commandment from God to ask the first man I meet in the street to give me fifty dollars, to assist me in doing the work of the Lord by translating the Golden Bible.'".

Chase recalls that Harris "reported that the Prophet's wife ... would be delivered of a male child that would be able when two years old to translate the Gold Bible."

Abel D. Chase
In 1879, Chase's brother Abel Chase gave a sworn statement re-asserting claims Willard had made and asserting that the 1833 affidavit was genuine.

Inspiration for the Salamander letter
The Chase Affidavit was a source of inspiration for the Salamander letter, a 20th-century forgery by Mark Hofmann. The Chase Affidavit describes "something like a toad", which was used as the source for Hofmann's "white salamander".

Notes

References

External links
 Apologetic rebuttal to Chase from FairMormon

1798 births
1871 deaths
People from Palmyra, New York
American Methodist clergy
History of the Latter Day Saint movement
Treasure hunters
Seership in Mormonism
19th-century American clergy